Niccolò Soggi (c. 1480 - 12 July 1552) was an Italian painter, born in Monte San Savino in the Province of Arezzo, Italy.

He was a pupil of Pietro Perugino, and was in Rome during the pontificate of Pope Leo X.  Soggi then moved to Prato, where Baldo Magini was his principal patron.  He eventually settled in Arezzo. Among his pupils was Papino della Pieve.

References 

 Baldini, Nicoletta, Niccolo Soggi, Florence, Edifir, 1997.
 Vasari, Giorgio, Le Vite delle più eccellenti pittori, scultori, ed architettori, many editions and translations.

1480s births
1552 deaths
People from Monte San Savino
15th-century Italian painters
Italian male painters
16th-century Italian painters
Painters from Tuscany